Omophron axillare is a species of ground beetle in the family Carabidae.

This species is known to be found only in mountainous regions. It is distributed across Afghanistan, Bangladesh, Pakistan, and India (Himachal Pradesh, Punjab, Uttar Pradesh, and Uttarakhand).

Omophron axillare has a length of 6 to 7 mm and a width of 3.6 to 3.9 mm. It has a shiny, testaceous (dull brick-red) colouring.

References

Further reading 
 Andrewes, H. E. (1926). On a collection of Carabidae from the Kumaon-Tibetian frontier. The Entomologists Magazine. LXII: 66.
 Andrewes, H. E. (1929). The fauna of British India, including Ceylon and Burmaa. Coleoptera. Carabidae. Vol. 1. – Carabinae. London: Taylor & Francis, xviii: 139–162.
 Chaudoir, M. (1868). Note monographique sur le genre Omophron. Revue et magasin de zoologie pure et appliquée. 20: 54–63. https://www.biodiversitylibrary.org/item/19604#page/7/mode/1up
 Gestro, R. (1892). Appunti sul genere Omophron. Annali del Museo Civico di Storia Naturale di Genova. 10 (1890–1891): 61.
 Hurka, K. (2003). Omophroninae. In: I. Löbl & Smetana A. (Eds.) Catalogue of Palearctic Coleoptera, Vol. 1. Stenstrup: Apollo Books, 207–208.
 Kryzhanovskij, O. L. (1982). A review of Palaearctic species of the genus Omophron Latr. (Coleoptera, Carabidae). Entomologicheskoe obozrenie. 61 (1): 107–116.

Carabidae
Beetles described in 1868